John Keogh (born 1940 in Finglas, Dublin) is an Irish former professional football player who played as a full back in the 1960s.

He started his footballing career with Stella Maris. They won the Dublin District Schoolboys League Under 14, 15, 16 & 17. Keogh was captain for the last two seasons. They also won the All-Ireland Under 15 title. His club mate at Stella Maris, Johnny Giles, went on to play with Manchester United, while Keogh was invited for trials at Chelsea but returned home after a couple of months.

He joined Shamrock Rovers in 1958 where he made 9 appearances in European competition. He made his debut in a Dublin City Cup game on 16 August 1959 .

A former youth and junior international he also made one appearance for the Republic of Ireland national football team on 4 May 1966, coming on as a substitute in a 4-0 defeat to West Germany at Dalymount Park .

"I received a telegram in work from Tom Scully, the Shamrock Rovers secretary, on the day of the game to be at Dalymount at 7pm that evening with my boots and shin-guards. I drove to out to Milltown from Finglas where I lived, but the place was locked up and there was no one there, so I had to climb over the wall, break in the door, grab my boots and climb out over the wall again. I stripped off in Dalymount and after a few minutes Theo Foley, who had been doubtful from the start, went down injured, and I was sent on and played very well."

Keogh shared his testimonial with Pat Courtney in May 1967 .

In January 1968 Keogh joined Cork Celtic F.C. for two seasons and lined up against his former club in the 1969 FAI Cup final. Alas, in his last final appearance he scored an own goal in a 1-1- draw. And the Milltown club won the replay 4-1.

In 1969, he joined Dundalk for his last two seasons.

He received an Eircom Legend of Irish Football Award at halftime during the World Cup qualifier game against Armenia at Croke Park on Wednesday 14 October 2009.

Honours
League of Ireland
  Shamrock Rovers 1963-64: 1
FAI Cup
  Shamrock Rovers 1962, 1964, 1965, 1966, 1967: 5
League of Ireland Shield
  Shamrock Rovers 1962-63, 1963–64, 1964–65, 1965-66: 4
Dublin City Cup
  Shamrock Rovers 1963-64, 1966-67: 2
Top Four Cup
  Shamrock Rovers 1965-66: 1
Leinster Senior Cup
  Shamrock Rovers 1964: 1

Sources 
 The Hoops by Paul Doolan and Robert Goggins
 The Complete Who's Who of Irish International Football, 1945-96 (1996):Stephen McGarrigle

1940 births
Living people
Association footballers from County Dublin
Shamrock Rovers F.C. players
Cork Celtic F.C. players
Dundalk F.C. players
League of Ireland players
Republic of Ireland association footballers
Republic of Ireland international footballers
United Soccer Association players
Boston Rovers players
League of Ireland XI players
Stella Maris F.C. players
Dublin University A.F.C. coaches
Association football defenders
Republic of Ireland football managers
Association football coaches